Bloc may refer to:

Government and politics
 Political bloc, a coalition of political parties
 Trade bloc, a type of intergovernmental agreement
 Voting bloc, a group of voters voting together

Other uses
 Bloc (code school), an educational website
 Bloc Hotels, a British hotel chain

See also
 
 
 Block (disambiguation)
 Bloc Party, a band
 Bloc party, a political party that is a constituent member of an electoral bloc
 Bloc Québécois, a political party in Canada
 Block voting, or bloc voting, types of electoral systems
 Eastern Bloc, a former group of communist states during the Cold War
 Western Bloc, countries aligned with the United States during the Cold War